Godmanchester Rovers Football Club is a football club based in Godmanchester, Cambridgeshire, England.

History
Established in 1911, the club won the Hunts Junior Cup. They played in the Huntingdonshire League for many years before joining the Cambridgeshire League. They won the Hunts Junior Cup again in 1988–89, and in 1992 were promoted to the top division of the Cambridgeshire League. In 1994–95 they won the League Cup, retaining it for the next two seasons. However, they were relegated to the Senior Division in 2000.

With the club about to move into a new ground, they made a speculative application to join the Eastern Counties League in 2002. Despite being in the second tier of the Cambridgeshire League, the club were successful. They finished bottom of the division in 2004–05, but were not relegated as the league was understrength in terms of numbers. In 2011–12 the club won Division One on goal difference to earn promotion to the Premier Division, and also won the Division One Knock-out Cup, defeating Whitton United 1–0 in the final.  In 2014–15 the club finished as runners-up in the Premier Division and won the Hunts Senior Cup. The 2015–16 they were Premier Division runners-up for a second successive season.

At the end of the 2020–21 season Godmanchester were transferred to the Premier Division South of the United Counties League.

Ground
Prior to their move to Bearscroft Lane the club played at Judith's Field on London Road, which was an open recreation ground with a pavilion. In 2002 they moved to their current ground, located a few hundred yards from their previous home.

Honours
Eastern Counties League
Division One champions 2011–12
Division One Knock-Out Cup winners 2011–12
Cambridgeshire League
League Cup winners 1994–95, 1995–96, 1996–97
Hinchingbrooke Cup
Winners 2018-19
Hunts Senior Cup
Winners 2014–15, 2018–19

Records
Best FA Cup performance: First qualifying round, 2009–10
Best FA Vase performance: Fifth round, 2018–19
Record attendance: 252 vs Sporting Khalsa, FA Vase Fourth round, 5 January 2019

See also
Godmanchester Rovers F.C. players

References

External links
Official website

Football clubs in England
Football clubs in Cambridgeshire
Association football clubs established in 1911
1911 establishments in England
Godmanchester
Cambridgeshire County Football League
Eastern Counties Football League
United Counties League